Ogo is a village in Diourbel Region, Senegal.

References

Populated places in Diourbel Region